The Cossiga II Cabinet, led by Francesco Cossiga, was the 37th cabinet of the Italian Republic.

It fell due to the rejection of the 1980 Budget by Parliament by secret ballot.

Party breakdown
 Christian Democracy (DC): Prime minister, 15 ministers, 34 undersecretaries
 Italian Socialist Party (PSI): 9 ministers, 18 undersecretaries
 Italian Republican Party (PRI): 3 ministers, 5 undersecretaries

Composition

|}

Italian governments
1980 establishments in Italy
1980 disestablishments in Italy
Cabinets established in 1980
Cabinets disestablished in 1980